|}

The Cocked Hat Stakes is a Listed flat horse race in Great Britain open to three-year-old colts and geldings. It is run at Goodwood over a distance of 1 mile 3 furlongs and 44 yards (2,253 metres), and it is scheduled to take place each year in May.

History
The event was established in 1970, and it was originally called the Predominate Stakes, although developed from a similar race called the Levin Down Stakes run up to 1969. It was named after Predominate, a three-time winner of the Goodwood Stakes from 1958 to 1960, and the winner of the Goodwood Cup in 1961.

For a period the Predominate Stakes was contested over 1 mile and 4 furlongs. It was cut to 1 mile, 1 furlong and 192 yards in 1988. A new distance of 1 mile and 3 furlongs was introduced in 2001.

The event was renamed the Cocked Hat Stakes in 2007. Its title recalls a light-hearted race staged at Goodwood in the 19th century, in which each rider had to wear a military hat.

The race sometimes serves as a trial for the Epsom Derby. The only horse to have won both events is Troy in 1979.

Records
Leading jockey (5 wins):
 Willie Carson – English Harbour (1978), Troy (1979), Prince Bee (1980), Morcon (1983), Minster Son (1988)
 Frankie Dettori - Dubai Millennium (1999), Roscius (2000), Rewilding (2010), Khalidi (2017), Private Secretary (2019)

Leading trainer (6 wins):
 Dick Hern – Charlton (1970), Buoy (1973), Troy (1979), Prince Bee (1980), Morcon (1983), Minster Son (1988)
 Sir Henry Cecil - General Ironside (1976), Royal Blend (1977), Lanfranco (1985), Razeen (1990), Opera Score (1994), Disclaimer (2013)

Winners

See also
 Horse racing in Great Britain
 List of British flat horse races
 Recurring sporting events established in 1970 – this race is included under its original title, Predominate Stakes.

References

 Paris-Turf:
 Racing Post:
 pedigreequery.com – Predominate Stakes – Goodwood.
 pedigreequery.com – Cocked Hat Stakes – Goodwood.

Flat races in Great Britain
Goodwood Racecourse
Flat horse races for three-year-olds
Recurring sporting events established in 1970
1970 establishments in England